The 2015 season of the FFAS Senior League Division 1 was the thirty-fifth season of association football competition in American Samoa.

Format 
Six teams competed in the league. The top team became the champion.

Table

References

External links 
 Standings at FIFA.com
 Season standings at rsssf.com

FFAS Senior League seasons
Amer
football